St. Joseph's Boys' Higher Secondary School is a private Catholic secondary school for boys located in Kozhikode, in the state of Kerala, India. Established by the Jesuits in 1793, it is one of the oldest educational institutions in India and the oldest school in Kerala. 

St. Joseph's Junior ICSE School in Kozhikode, established by the Jesuits in 1961, is a feeder school for the higher secondary school.

Notable alumni 

 Leon AugustineIndian footballer with Bengaluru FC
 Joseph G. DavisAn information systems researcher and professor, University of Sydney
 K. KelappanIndian freedom fighter, founder of Nair Service Society
 Faizal KottikollonChief executive of KEF Holdings
 Vinod Kovoorfilm/TV actor
 Moorkoth KumaranSecond S.N.D.P Yogam General Secretary 
 Neeraj MadhavActor, Rapper and Dancer.
 Padmashri Dr Azad MoopenChairman and managing director of Aster DM Healthcare
 M. K. MuneerPolitician, Doctor, Social worker, Singer, Poet and Author
 Justice Bechu Kurian ThomasAn Indian judge
 N. V. Krishna WarrierPoet, Scholar, Critic, Essayist
 P. A. Mohammed Riyas, Minister of PWD and Tourism
 SudheeshActor

See also

 List of Jesuit schools
 List of schools in Kerala
 Violence against Christians in India

References

Boys' schools in India
Jesuit secondary schools in India
Christian schools in Kerala
High schools and secondary schools in Kerala
Schools in Kozhikode
Educational institutions established in 1793
1793 establishments in India
1793 establishments in the British Empire